The Summer Carnaval (Dutch: Zomercarnaval) is an annual event the Dutch city Rotterdam. It mimics the Carnaval of Latin America and the Dutch Caribbean (Aruba, Bonaire & Curacao). The Summer Carnival offers people an opportunity to celebrate Carnival in such a manner. The Dutch city of Arnhem used to organize Rio on the Rhine, which attracted more than 150.000 visitors, while the Rotterdam event attracts nearly a million visitors yearly. Summer Carnaval is often compared to Karneval der Kulturen (Berlin) and Notting Hill Carnival (London). In 2001 the Carnival was honoured with the prestigious Dutch Prince Claus Award, for their work in promoting the positive contribution of Antillean culture to Dutch society.

Zomercarnaval Rotterdam
The first Zomercarnaval was held on August 4, 1984, in Rotterdam to allow residents to experience Carnival as celebrated in warmer climates, with the West Indies being a predominant influence. Zomercarnaval Rotterdam has become a multi-day event that attracts almost one million visitors every year.

Although the street parade attracts the most visitors the Zomercarnaval is a multi-day event. A week prior to the street parade the new Queen is elected in the official Zomercarnaval Queen Election. On the Thursday after the election the Zomercarnaval Beach Party is held at the Stand aan de Maas, a small beach created in the city center of Rotterdam. Several brass bands and DJ's show up and the newly chosen Queen is also present. On Friday evening the Battle of Drums is held, an event in which several brass bands compete to be named the official Zomercarnaval brass band and earn a spot in the parade the day after as well as in the Notting Hill Carnival in London. The street parade which is always held on Saturday includes brass bands and thousands of dancers. During and after the street parade there are two live on stage concerts at the Coolsingel and the Churchillplein until late in the evening.

In 2007 the Rotterdam carnival had an agreement with the Notting Hill Carnival for exchange of brass and steel bands.

Queens

2003: Patricia Tulen
2005: Imara Thomas
2006: Katy Cedeño Manzanillo was chosen to be the Queen of the 2006 Zomercarnaval in the Rotterdam Cruise Terminal on July 17, 2006. She is from Dominican descent and was part of the Grupo Carnaval Dominicano. In total eight contestants participated in the Queen Election, in which Lamya M'Haidra of Carnaval & Friends and Maria Elizabeth Kooij Martinez of Colores Latinos became second and third.
2007: Marcie de Jongh – Originally from Aruba Marcie de Jongh was chosen as the Queen of the 2007 Zomercarnaval. Again the election was held in the Rotterdam Cruise Terminal. She was part of the Kingdoms under the Sun Group from Amsterdam. The election was different from other years, where the candidates showed their skills in several rounds of various clothing types. This time they had to excel in communication and flair. Seven candidates challenged for the title. Behind De Jongh the second spot was for Diandra Bramble of Aruba Uni She lost with only 0,03 percent of the votes. Fabienne Kadirbaks of Caribbean Jewels won the third spot.

References

External links

 Official website Rio on the Rhine - Arnhem
 Official website Drunken Dropkes - Bentelo
 Official website Summer Carnival - Kortrijk
 Official website Summer Carnival -Rotterdam

Carnivals in the Netherlands
Events in Arnhem
Culture in Kortrijk
Culture in Rotterdam
Tourist attractions in Rotterdam
Festivals established in 1984
1984 establishments in the Netherlands